Joy-Ann Skinner is the Ambassador Extraordinary and Plenipotentiary of Barbados to the European Union, Belgium, and France.  On March 29, 2019, she presented her credentials as ambassador to Luxembourg.

Skinner earned a BSc in Political Science from the University of the West Indies and a post graduate diploma in International Relations.

References

Ambassadors of Barbados to Belgium
Ambassadors of Barbados to France
Ambassadors of Barbados to the European Union
Ambassadors of Barbados to Luxembourg
University of the West Indies alumni
Living people
Barbadian women ambassadors
Year of birth missing (living people)